Bob Bryan and Mike Bryan were the defending champions but lost in the first round to Christophe Rochus and Olivier Rochus.

Wayne Black and Kevin Ullyett won in the final 7–5, 6–3 against Mahesh Bhupathi and Max Mirnyi.

Seeds
The top four seeded teams received byes into the second round.

Draw

Finals

Top half

Bottom half

External links
 2002 Stella Artois Championships Doubles draw

2002 Stella Artois Championships